The Rose Canyon Fault is a right-lateral strike-slip fault running in a north-south direction through San Diego County, California.

Extent 
It starts in the Mission Valley area and heads past Mt. Soledad and La Jolla into the Pacific Ocean where it joins other faults such as the Oceanside Fault.

Current state 

Not much is known about the Rose Canyon fault, though its slip-rate is thought to be 1.1 mm/year.

The Rose Canyon Fault has sustained at least one late Holocene rupture, with the date of the earthquake estimated to be after AD 1450 and most likely prior to construction of the San Diego Mission in 1769, as a large historical Rose Canyon earthquake would likely have destroyed that mission. The last earthquake believed to have occurred on the fault occurring on May 27, 1862, which was around magnitude 6; however, its association with the Rose Canyon Fault is debatable.

The Rose Canyon Fault has garnered more attention because it runs through such highly populated areas and was formerly thought not to be much of a threat.  Some geophysicists, such as Scripps Institution of Oceanography researcher Jeff Babcock, have hypothesized that a concentrated earthquake involving the Rose Canyon, Oceanside, and Newport–Inglewood faults could result in an earthquake up to magnitude 7.6 on the moment magnitude scale. A 2017 study concluded that, together, the Newport–Inglewood Fault and Rose Canyon Fault could produce an earthquake of 7.3 or 7.4 magnitude.

References 

Sources

Further reading

External links 
 Faults and Earthquakes in San Diego County – San Diego Natural History Museum

Seismic faults of California
Geology of San Diego County, California
La Jolla, San Diego
Mission Valley, San Diego